Beurer GmbH is a German family-owned Mittelstand manufacturer of electrical devices for health and well-being. Originally a manufacturer of electric blankets, the company began diversifying its product line in the 1980s and now sell some 2,200 products including weighing scales, blood pressure monitors, and mobile ECG devices. Founded in Ulm in 1919, the company in 2016 employed 800 people and had revenues of about 230 million Euro. Production was based in Uttenweiler since 1963 but was shifted to Hungary and the Far East, with Uttenweiler becoming the company's main logistics center in Germany in 2011. The company also grew by acquisitions, taking over British electric blanket manufacturer Winterwarm. Winterwarm's Birmingham plant was shut down in 2005 when manufacturing was moved to Hungary.

References 

Companies based in Ulm
Electrical engineering companies of Germany
Medical technology companies of Germany
Multinational companies headquartered in Germany
German brands
German companies established in 1919
Technology companies established in 1919